Gerald Owen Anderson Watt (born December 19, 1938) is an Antiguan politician and a former cabinet minister.

Early life 
Watt was born on December 19, 1938, in Antigua and Barbuda.

Political career 
Watt represented St. John's Rural East from 1971 - 1976 and is a former Chairman of the Antigua & Barbuda Electoral Commission (ABEC)., He also served as attorney general during his time as Minister of National Security, Labour, and Legal Affairs.

Watt has been the Speaker of the House of Representatives since 25 June 2014. He can be considered bipartisan.

References 

Living people
1938 births
Speakers of the House of Representatives (Antigua and Barbuda)
Government ministers of Antigua and Barbuda
Attorneys general of Antigua and Barbuda
Progressive Labour Movement politicians